Putative survival-related protein is a protein that in humans is encoded by the CASZ1 gene.

References

External links

Further reading